Loni Haveli is a village in Parner taluka in Ahmednagar district of state of Maharashtra, India.

Religion
The majority of the population in the village is Hindu.

Economy
The majority of the population has farming as their primary occupation.

Villagers now started to looking for milk production and  goat farming. Overall population depend on agriculture activities.

See also
 Parner taluka
 Villages in Parner taluka

References

Villages in Parner taluka
Villages in Ahmednagar district